The  is a Japanese Shinkansen high-speed train with tilting capability operated by JR Central and JR West on the Tokaido and San'yō Shinkansen lines since 2020, and JR Kyushu on the Nishi Kyushu Shinkansen line since 2022.

History
In June 2016, JR Central announced plans to build a new prototype "N700S" 16-car trainset (with "S" standing for "Supreme") for evaluating new technology and features on the Tokaido and Sanyo Shinkansen lines from March 2018.

Developed from the earlier N700 series design, the new train will incorporate a number of new features. Refinements to the ATC and braking systems will enable shorter braking distances in emergencies such as earthquakes. Optimized underfloor equipment layout will allow the same standard design to be used to easily produce 12, 8 and 6-car trainsets in addition to the Tokaido Shinkansen 16-car trainsets. The optimization is intended to make the train more flexible for possible export. The optimization further allows Toshiba SCiB LTO batteries to be installed so that the train can operate at low speed in the event of a disruption to overhead power. Green cars will use active suspension to further improve ride quality, and ordinary-class cars will have AC power outlets for each seat.

JR Central 
A 16-car prototype set (J0), assembled at the Nippon Sharyo Toyokawa plant, was unveiled at Hamamatsu depot on 10 March 2018. Beginning from 20 March, this set has been used for testing and evaluation. The first full-production J set (J1) was delivered to JR Central in April 2020, with trains entering revenue service on 1 July 2020.

This is  faster than the fastest speed ever achieved by the N700A, and may indicate plans to raise the maximum operating speed on the line.

JR Central announced in May 2022 that it would add 19 trainsets (304 vehicles) to their current N700S fleet. The first two of these trainsets are scheduled to enter service in 2023.

Taiwan High Speed Rail 
On March 15, 2023, Taiwan High Speed Rail announced it will purchase 12 new trains consisting of 12 cars each to replace some of its older 700T sets. These will be manufactured by an alliance of Hitachi and Toshiba.

Operations 
The first N700S sets replaced 700 series trains, and added more rolling stock needed to realize the increased amount of services on the Tokaido Shinkansen planned from 2020. The N700S series is expected to gradually replace N700 series sets on the Sanyo, Tokaido, and Kyushu Shinkansen lines. A 6-car variant started operations on the Nishi Kyushu Shinkansen on 23 September 2022.

The train is also planned to run on the proposed Texas Central Railway high-speed line connecting Dallas and Houston.

Variants 

 N700S series: 12 x 16-car "J" sets owned by JR Central, introduced from 1 July 2020
 N700S-3000 series: 2 x 16-car "H" sets owned by JR West, introduced from 13 March 2021
N700S-8000 series "Kamome": 4 x 6-car "Y" sets owned by JR Kyushu on the Nishi Kyushu Shinkansen from autumn 2022

16-car J sets 

The J sets were the first to be introduced, and include the pre-series J0 set used for testing between 2018 and 2020.

Formation
The 16-car J sets are formed as follows.

Fleet list
, the JR Central N700S series 'J' set fleet is as follows.

16-car H sets (N700S-3000 series) 
These are 16-car N700S series sets owned by JR West and classified as N700S-3000 series sets.

Formation
The 16-car H sets are formed as follows.

Fleet list

6-car Y sets (N700S-8000 series) 
These are 6-car N700S series sets owned by JR Kyushu and classified as N700S-8000 series sets.

Formation
The 6-car Y sets are formed as follows.

Fleet list

Overall fleet history
The annual totals for the fleet sizes (number of vehicles as of 1 April each year) are as follows.

See also
 List of high-speed trains

References

Central Japan Railway Company
West Japan Railway Company
Kyushu Railway Company
Shinkansen train series
Hitachi multiple units
Nippon Sharyo multiple units
Train-related introductions in 2020
Tilting trains
Passenger trains running at least at 300 km/h in commercial operations
Electric multiple units of Japan
25 kV AC multiple units